Gareth Miles is a Welsh-language author, translator, and a founder of . He is a Marxist and translated Hamlet into the Welsh language from that perspective. In 2008 his book  won the Wales Book of the Year for Welsh language fiction.

References 

Welsh-language writers
Welsh dramatists and playwrights
Welsh republicans
Welsh socialists
People from Gwynedd
Living people
Year of birth missing (living people)